The Pilgrimage ("Diary of a Magus") is a 1987 novel by Brazilian novelist Paulo Coelho.  It is a recollection of Paulo's experiences as he made his way across northern Spain on a pilgrimage to Santiago de Compostela. The novel serves as part adventure story, part guide to self-discovery. Was adapted into the 1997 adventure game Pilgrim: Faith as a Weapon, also written by Paulo Coelho.

Plot summary
The story begins in 1986 when Coelho undertakes his initiation into the order Regnus Agnus Mundi (RAM), which he subsequently fails. He is then told that he must embark on a pilgrimage along the Camino de Santiago to find the sword that is the symbol of his acceptance into the ranks of RAM. He must do this to gain insight into the simplicity of life. The journey transforms him as he learns to understand the nature of truth through the simplicity of life.

He begins his journey with a guide, also a member of RAM, who goes by the alias Petrus. During the journey Petrus shows him meditation exercises and introduces him to some of the more down-to-earth elements of Western mystical thought and philosophy, and teaches him about love and its forms: agape, philia and eros.

References

External links 
 The Pilgrimage Blog

1987 Brazilian novels
Novels by Paulo Coelho
Portuguese-language novels
Novels set in Spain
Fiction set in 1986
Esoteric Christianity
Camino de Santiago
20th-century Brazilian novels
Pilgrimage accounts